Maniac (also known as The Maniac) is a 1963 British psychological thriller film directed by Michael Carreras and starring Kerwin Mathews, Nadia Gray and Donald Houston.

Plot
The story tells of vacationing American artist Jeff Farrell who becomes romantically involved with an older woman named Eve Beynat in southern France while at the same time harboring an attraction to her teenage stepdaughter, Annette. Eve's husband/Annette's father Georges is in an asylum for, four years ago, using a blowtorch to kill a man who had raped Annette. Believing it will help make Eve his for life, Jeff agrees to assist her in springing Georges from the asylum. Of course, Eve has a completely different agenda in mind. Inspector Etienne sets up a plot to help trap the real killer, and the climactic scenes are set at Les Baux-de-Provence in the huge stone galleries dug into the rock of the Val d'Enfer on the road to Maillane.

Cast
 Kerwin Mathews as Jeff Farrell
 Nadia Gray as Eve Beynat
 Donald Houston as Henri
 Liliane Brousse as Annette Beynat
 George Pastell as Inspector Etienne
 Arnold Diamond as Janiello
 Norman Bird as Salon
 Justine Lord as Grace
 Jerold Wells as Giles
 Leon Peers as Blanchard
 André Maranne as Salon

Production
The film was shot in black-and-white in the Camargue district of southern France and the MGM British Studios in Borehamwood, Hertfordshire. Some filming occurred at Bray Studios in Berkshire.

Release
Maniac was released by Hammer Film Productions on 20 May 1963 in the United Kingdom. Released on Blu-ray by Mill Creek in 2018.

Critical reception
Andy Black wrote: "Maniac was written and produced by Jimmy Sangster, with Michael Carreras handling direction, and what an under-rated director he was. Donald Houston is George, an escapee from a French asylum (obviously Les Diaboliques had a big effect on Sangster, who also set Taste of Fear in France) who wants to kill his wife's lover. The wife is Nadia Gray, and the lover is Kerwin Matthews. Houston underplays, and also has a fetish for oxy-acetylene torches, with which he causes much panic. A brief 86 minutes and full of little twists and 'who's-behind-the-door' shocks, it really works first time you see it, but is not a film to watch repeatedly."

Turner Classic Movies wrote "Maniac has excellent production values but labors under the weight of yet another gimmicky and obvious script by Jimmy Sangster...The acting is fine, especially that of Kerwin Mathews and Liliane Brousse."; and in The New York Times, Bosley Crowther wrote "Maniac has one thing and has it in spades—a plot of extraordinary cunning...(It) takes on a twitching suspense that simmers, sizzles and explodes in a neat backflip", though he concluded "Michael Carrera's direction is uneven and the characters are a generally flabby lot...Maniac remains a striking blueprint, with satanic tentacles, for a much better picture."

References

External links

 

1963 films
1960s thriller films
Films shot in England
Hammer Film Productions films
British thriller films
Films directed by Michael Carreras
Columbia Pictures films
Films shot in France
British black-and-white films
Hammer Film Productions horror films
Films with screenplays by Jimmy Sangster
Films produced by Jimmy Sangster
Films shot at Bray Studios
Films shot at MGM-British Studios
1960s English-language films
1960s British films